Many different conditions can lead to the feeling of dyspnea (shortness of breath). DiagnosisPro, an online medical expert system, listed 497 in October 2010. The most common cardiovascular causes are acute myocardial infarction and congestive heart failure while common pulmonary causes include: chronic obstructive pulmonary disease, asthma, pneumothorax, and pneumonia.

Pulmonary 

 Obstructive lung diseases
 Asthma
 Bronchitis
 Chronic obstructive pulmonary disease
 Cystic fibrosis
 Emphysema
 Hookworm disease
 Diseases of lung parenchyma and pleura
 Contagious
 Anthrax through inhalation of Bacillus anthracis
 Pneumonia
 COVID-19
 Non-contagious
 Fibrosing alveolitis
 Atelectasis
 Hypersensitivity pneumonitis
 Interstitial lung disease
 Lung cancer
 Pleural effusion
 Pneumoconiosis
 Pneumothorax
 Non-cardiogenic pulmonary edema or acute respiratory distress syndrome
 Sarcoidosis
 Pulmonary vascular diseases
 Acute or recurrent pulmonary emboli
 Pulmonary hypertension, primary or secondary
 Pulmonary veno-occlusive disease
 Superior vena cava syndrome

Other causes 

 Obstruction of the airway
 Cancer of the larynx or pharynx
 Empty nose syndrome
 Pulmonary aspiration
 Epiglottitis
 Laryngeal edema
 Vocal cord dysfunction
 Immobilization of the diaphragm
 Lesion of the phrenic nerve
 Polycystic liver disease
 Tumor in the diaphragm
 Restriction of the chest volume
 Ankylosing spondylitis
 Broken ribs
 Kyphosis of the spine
 Obesity
 Costochondritis
 Pectus excavatum
 Scoliosis
 Disorders of the cardiovascular system
 Aortic dissection
 Cardiomyopathy
 Congenital heart disease
 CREST syndrome
 Heart failure
 Ischaemic heart disease
 Malignant hypertension
 Pericardium disorders, including:
 Cardiac tamponade
 Constrictive pericarditis
 Pericardial effusion
 Pulmonary edema
 Pulmonary embolism
 Pulmonary hypertension
 Valvular heart disease
 Disorders of the blood and metabolism
 Anemia
 Hypothyroidism
 Adrenal insufficiency
 Metabolic acidosis
 Sepsis
 Leukemia
 Holocarboxylase synthetase deficiency
 Disorders affecting breathing nerves and muscles
 Amyotrophic lateral sclerosis
 Guillain–Barré syndrome
 Multiple sclerosis
 Myasthenia gravis
 Parsonage Turner syndrome
 Eaton-Lambert syndrome
 Chronic fatigue syndrome
 Psychological conditions
 Anxiety disorders and panic attacks
 Medications
 Fentanyl
 Other
 Carbon monoxide poisoning
 Pregnancy

References 

Symptoms and signs: Respiratory system
Lists of diseases